James W. Porter was an American politician.

He was a member of the New York State Assembly in 1843, representing Washington County during the 66th New York State Legislature as a Whig.

References

New York (state) Whigs
19th-century American politicians
Year of birth missing
Year of death missing
People from Washington County, New York
Members of the New York State Assembly